Thembinkosi Mbamba (9 September 1995 – 25 May 2019) was a South African professional footballer who played as a striker.

Career
Mbamba played for TS Galaxy of the National First Division, with whom he won the 2018–19 Nedbank Cup in May 2019.

He died in a car accident in the early hours of 25 May 2019.

References

1995 births
2019 deaths
South African soccer players
TS Galaxy F.C. players
Association football forwards
Place of death missing
Place of birth missing
Road incident deaths in South Africa